All Out is a 1973 album by Grin.

Where the first two Grin albums had featured the band as trio augmented by overdubs, singalong choirs or even orchestras, the recent addition of Nils' brother Tom as second guitarist made the band a solid quartet. The only additional performer is blues-shouter Kathi McDonald, who contributes backing vocals on several songs [most notably "Heart on Fire" and "She Ain't Right"].

Nils' liner notes in The Very Best of Grin attribute the "classy" solo in "Sad Letter" to Tom. "She Ain't Right" is also notable as the only Grin tune not attributed to Nils alone, but co-written with bassist Bob Gordon.

All Out was re-released on CD in 2009 with the single version of "Love Or Else" added as bonus track.

LP cover and CD version 
The title of the album does not appear on the outside cover. The mouth on the front cover is a flap which, when raised, reveals an open mouth with the words "ALL OUT" inside. The back cover features a photo of Nils with a thought bubble drawn in containing the track listing. The inside sleeve has a color photo of the band standing in a field on one side, and the lyrics on the other side.

For the CD release, the booklet simply has the closed mouth on the front and the open mouth on the back. The thought-bubble-and-Nils image appears on the back insert, along with other credits. There is no inside artwork.

Track listing 
 "Sad Letter" - 3:10
 "Heavy Chevy" - 3:34
 "Don't Be Long" - 2:17
 "Love Again" - 4:05
 "She Ain't Right" - 3:27
 "Love or Else" - 3:40
 "Ain't Love Nice" - 2:07
 "Heart On Fire" - 5:00
 "All Out" - 3:04
 "Rusty Gun" - 2:24
 "Love Or Else" (single version) (2009 CD only)

Personnel
Grin
 Nils Lofgren - guitars, keyboards, accordion on "Rusty Gun", lead vocals
 Bob Berberich - drums, lead vocals
 Bob Gordon - bass, backing vocals
 Tom Lofgren - guitars, backing vocals

Special thanks to:
 Kathi McDonald [misspelled as "Kathy McDonald"] - vocals
Technical
 Art Direction/Design - Anthony Hudson
 Air Brush - Charlie Wild
 Photography - Joel Bernstein
 Produced by David Briggs
 Distributed by CBS Records

Releases
 LP All Out Spindizzy Records     1972
 CD All Out Sony Music Distribution	 2001
 CD All Out [Bonus Track] American Beat Records    2009

References
All information from album cover and label.

1973 albums
Nils Lofgren albums
Albums produced by David Briggs (producer)
Epic Records albums